Adelobotrys is a genus of plants in the family Melastomataceae. It contains the following species (but this list may be incomplete):
 Adelobotrys panamensis, Almeda

References

Melastomataceae
Melastomataceae genera
Taxonomy articles created by Polbot